WLZA (96.1 FM is a classic hits radio station whose city of licence is Eupora, Mississippi. WLZA serves Starkville, Columbus, West Point, Mississippi and North-Central Mississippi with an ERP of 40,000 watts. WLZA is owned by Stephen C. Davenport, through licensee Telesouth Communications Inc.

History

WLZA signed on the air September 1, 1978, as WEXA, the sister to WEPA 710 AM. It carried a contemporary rock format as well as Mississippi State University football and local high school sports. The call letters changed to WLZA in 1988.

In 1997, new studios were built for WLZA on Stark Road in Starkville; the station moved in the next year, and WEPA shut down in March 1998. WLZA transitioned to a hot adult contemporary format including the Rick and Bubba Show as well as Sunday worship programming.

Effective June 21, 2016 Metro Radio sold WLZA to Telesouth Communications, Inc. for $500,000.

On February 17, 2017 WLZA changed their format from hot adult contemporary to classic hits.

References

External links

FCC History Cards for WLZA

Classic hits radio stations in the United States
LZA